The Delbeck  Champagne house was established in 1832 by Félix-Désiré Delbeck in Reims.

History
Delbeck was a Flemish banker who invested in vineyards, and the husband of baronne Balsamie Ponsardin who was a niece of the Veuve Clicquot. Delbeck champagne found favour with the court of Louis-Philippe of France, and was in 1838 named the official Champagne of the French monarchy. Subsequently Delbeck is the exclusive Champagne allowed to bear the royal emblem & the motto "Fournisseurs de l'Ancienne Cour de France". The reputation of Delbeck grew during the years 1870 to 1912, and in 1884 it was the 3rd largest Champagne imported to the United States and Canada.

See also
 List of Champagne houses

References

Champagne producers
Food product brands
Food and drink companies established in 1832
French companies established in 1832
French brands